Prognathodes basabei, the orange margin butterflyfish, is a species of marine ray-finned fish, a butterflyfish belonging to the family Chaetodontidae. It is found in Hawaii.

Etymology
Named in honor of Peter K. Basabe, a diver and aquarium fish collector, for his role in the collection of the first specimen of this new species in 1998.

References

basabei
Taxa named by Richard Pyle
Taxa named by Randall Kosaki
Fish described in 2016
Fish of Hawaii